Nong Saeng is a district (amphoe) of Udon Thani province, northeastern Thailand.

Geography
Neighboring districts are (from the west clockwise) Nong Wua So, Mueang Udon Thani, Kumphawapi, and Non Sa-at of Udon Thani Province, and Khao Suan Kwang of Khon Kaen province.

History
The area of the district was originally part of Kumphawapi district. It was made a minor district (king amphoe) on 1 January 1981, then consisting of two tambons and 27 villages. The district office was opened in village three of tambon Nong Saeng on 1 January 1983.

Administration
The district is divided into four sub-districts (tambons), which are further subdivided into 38 villages (mubans). Saeng Sawang is a township (thesaban tambon) which covers parts of tambon Saeng Sawang. There are a further four tambon administrative organizations (TAO).

References

External links
amphoe.com

Nong Saeng